Suzie is a feminine given name.

Suzie may also refer to:
 "Suzie" (Boy Kill Boy song), 2005
 "Suzie" (John Entwistle song), 1996
 Suzie (film), a 2009 French-Canadian drama film
 Suzie River, Quebec, Canada

See also
 
 Suzi (disambiguation)
 Suzy (disambiguation)
 Susy (disambiguation)
 Susi (disambiguation)
 Susie (disambiguation)